Patoka Township is the name of four townships in Indiana:

 Patoka Township, Crawford County, Indiana
 Patoka Township, Dubois County, Indiana
 Patoka Township, Gibson County, Indiana
 Patoka Township, Pike County, Indiana

Indiana township disambiguation pages